Chak Jhumra Junction railway station is located in Chak Jhumra town, Faisalabad district of Punjab province, Pakistan.

See also
 List of railway stations in Pakistan
 Pakistan Railways

References

External links

Railway stations in Punjab, Pakistan
Railway stations on Sangla Hill–Kundian Branch Line
Railway stations on Khanewal–Wazirabad Line